The Roma Party (RP) is a political party in Serbia representing the Romani minority. 

Founded in 2003, the party is registered as a political party of the Romani minority. The party president is Srđan Šajn.

Electoral results

Parliamentary Elections

References

Political parties of minorities in Serbia
Romani in Serbia
Romani political parties